The 1986 NCAA Division I women's basketball tournament began on March 12 and ended on March 30. The tournament expanded to 40 teams from 32. The Final Four consisted of Texas, Tennessee, Western Kentucky, and USC, with Texas defeating Southern California, 97-81 in the championship game.  Texas's Clarissa Davis was named the Most Outstanding Player of the tournament. With their championship win, Texas completed the first undefeated season (34-0) since the NCAA began sponsoring women's basketball in 1982.

ESPN expanded their coverage to show all four Regional finals and the National semifinals. CBS continued to broadcast the Championship game.

Notable events

James Madison opened their regular season with a game against Virginia, which the Cavaliers won by 14 points, 71–57. James Madison went on to a regular season record of 26–3, which earned them an 8 seed in the Tournament. As the higher seed, they were eligible to play their first-round game at home, but they were unable to host, so played their opponent, Providence at the home court of Providence. James Madison won the close game 55–53, to move on to the second round. Their opponent would be Virginia, who earned a number 1 seed in the tournament. The game started out with the Cavaliers taking five points with just over eleven minutes to go in the first half. The JMU Dukes then held Virginia to only a single field goal for the rest of the half and took an eleven-point lead at halftime. The two teams would play roughly evenly in the second half, with Virginia only managing to reduce the lead by two points. James Madison won the game 71–62, advancing to the regional semifinal, which was the first time in the five-year history of the NCAA Tournament that a team had defeated a number 1 seed prior to the Regional round.

After earning a number one national ranking in 1984, but stumbling in the regional's finals to national power Louisiana Tech, Texas seemed poised for a better result in 1985. Not only did the team earn another top national ranking, but they entered the NCAA Tournament knowing that if they reached the Final Four, they would have the home court advantage with the final games scheduled for their own Frank Erwin Center. Home court would play a part, but not the part hoped for by the Longhorns. In the regional semi-finals, played at the home court of Western Kentucky University, the Hilltoppers stymied the Longhorn's hopes with a 92–90 victory. They would return to the 1986 tournament viewed as one of the top teams in the nation and were once again ranked the top team in the nation, but they still did not have a Final Four NCAA appearance on their resume.

The Texas team won their first game easily, then continued to the regional, this time on their home court. They dispatched Oklahoma easily, then struggled against Mississippi, who were trying to prevent the team from a Final Four yet again. This time, Texas prevailed and beat Mississippi by three points to head to their first NCAA Final Four. Their opponent in the semifinal was none other than Western Kentucky, who had denied them the previous year. This time, the result would be very different, as the Longhorns beat Western Kentucky easily, 90–65.

The other semifinal pitted Tennessee against Southern California.  Cheryl Miller was the best player at USC, and had led the team to the national championship in 1984. Miller went on to play for the USA national team and helped the USA win the gold medal at the 1984 Olympics. 1986 was Miller's senior year at USC. The game between Tennessee and USC was a rematch of a physical game played in December, in which Miller was thrown out of the game for an elbow. The game was close, but USC ended up with an 85–77 win. In the rematch, Miller would again come out of the game, but under very different circumstances. She was worried about getting hurt, and with a 70–51 lead, didn't need to stay in. In that game, USC won by 24 points, 83–59.

That set up the championship game between USC and undefeated Texas. The Texas team was very deep but had suffered a number of injuries during the year. The game was close early with the Trojans leading at times in the first half, but Texas went on a 10–2 run to take a seven-point lead. Miller would have one of the worst games in her career. Although she scored 16 points, twelve of those were from the free throw line. She was only 2 for 11 from the field, without a single point in the second half. In contrast, Texas' Clarissa Davis came off the bench to score 25 and earn Most Outstanding Player honors. USC's Cynthia Cooper scored 27 points, and Texas won the national championship 97–81 to complete the first undefeated season in NCAA history.

Records
Cheryl Miller set the Final Four record of free throws in a single game with 12, in the championship game.

Clarissa Davis set the Final Four record for rebounds in a half, with 14 in the second half of the semifinal game.

The National Championship game between Texas and USC set several Final Four scoring marks:
 Most points by one team – 97
 Most points combined by both teams – 178
 Most field goals in a game – 40

Texas had 23 assists in the semi-final game, a record (since 1985, when the category was established), and followed that with 22 in the championship game.

Kamie Ethridge had 20 assists in the two Final Four games, a record for the combined Final Four games.

Qualifying teams – automatic
Forty teams were selected to participate in the 1986 NCAA Tournament. Seventeen conferences were eligible for an automatic bid to the 1986 NCAA tournament.

Qualifying teams – at-large
Twenty-three additional teams were selected to complete the forty invitations.

Bids by conference
Twenty-one conferences earned an automatic bid. In thirteen cases, the automatic bid was the only representative from the conference. Eighteen additional at-large teams were selected from seven of the conferences, plus one independent (not associated with an athletic conference) team earned at-large bids.

First and second rounds 

In 1986, the field expanded to 40 teams. The teams were seeded, and assigned to four geographic regions, with seeds 1-10 in each region. In Round 1, seeds 8 and 9 faced each other for the opportunity to face the 1 seed in the second round, while seeds 7 and 10 faced each other for the opportunity to face the 2 seed.
In  the first two rounds, the higher seed was given the opportunity to host the first-round game. In most cases, the higher seed accepted the opportunity. The exceptions:
 Illinois was an eight seed, but chose not to host, so the game was played at nine seed Ohio
 James Madison, the eight seed, played ninth seeded Providence at Providence
 Arkansas, the eight seed, played ninth seeded Missouri at Missouri
 Kentucky, the seven seed, played the tenth seeded Drake at Drake

The following table lists the region, host school, venue and the twenty-four first round locations:

Regionals and Final Four

The regionals, named  for the general location, were held from March 20 to March 23 at these sites:

 Midwest Regional  Frank Erwin Center, Austin, Texas (Host: University of Texas)
 East Regional  Palestra,  Philadelphia (Host: Villanova University)
 Mideast Regional   Carver–Hawkeye Arena, Iowa City, Iowa (Host: University of Iowa)
 West Regional  Long Beach Arena, Long Beach, California (Host: Long Beach State)
Each regional winner  advanced to the Final Four, held March 28 and March 30 in Lexington, Kentucky at Rupp Arena

Bids by state

The forty teams came from twenty-five states.
Pennsylvania had the most teams with four.  Twenty-five states did not have any teams receiving bids.

Brackets
Games played at better seed except where noted.

East regional – Philadelphia, Pennsylvania (Palestra)

Midwest regional – University of Texas – Austin, Texas (Frank Erwin Center)

Mideast regional – University of Iowa, Iowa City, Iowa (Carver–Hawkeye Arena)

West regional – Long Beach State University – Long Beach, California (Long Beach Arena)

Final Four – Lexington, Kentucky (Rupp Arena)

Record by  conference
Sixteen conferences had more than one  bid, or at least one win in NCAA Tournament play:

Seven conferences  went 0-1: Gateway, High Country, Metro, MAAC, MAC, Southland, and WAC

All-Tournament team
 Clarissa Davis, University of Texas at Austin
 Fran Harris, University of Texas at Austin
 Cheryl Miller, University of Southern California
 Cynthia Cooper, University of Southern California
 Clemette Haskins, Western Kentucky University

Game officials
 Kit Robinson (semifinal)
 June Courteau (semifinal)
 Bob Olsen (semifinal)
 Bill Stokes (semifinal)

See also
1986 NCAA Division I men's basketball tournament
1986 NCAA Division II women's basketball tournament
1986 NCAA Division III women's basketball tournament
1986 NAIA women's basketball tournament

References

 
NCAA Division I women's basketball tournament
NCAA Division I women's basketball tournament
NCAA Division I women's basketball tournament
Basketball in Austin, Texas